Puddy the Pup is a Terrytoons cartoon character who featured in a theatrical short film series from 1935 to 1942. He also appeared as Farmer Al Falfa's sidekick in other Terrytoon shorts, such as Tin Can Tourist and Farmer Al Falfa's Prize Package. The character is a white dog with a black ear, a design similar to generic dogs in various Terrytoons.

Filmography

 A Puddy-esque dog appears in A Dog's Dream (1941), but without black spots.

References

External links
 Puddy the Pup at Big Cartoon DataBase

Film characters introduced in 1935
Film series introduced in 1935
Fictional dogs
Child characters in animated films
Male characters in animation
Animated film series
Terrytoons characters